Born in 1747 in the Touraine region of France, Pierre Desloges moved to Paris as a young man, where he became a bookbinder and upholsterer. He was deafened at age seven from smallpox, but did not learn to sign until he was 27, when he was taught by a deaf Italian.

In 1779, he wrote what may be the first book published by a deaf person, in which he advocated for the use of sign language in deaf education. It was in part a rebuttal of the views of Abbé Claude-François Deschamps de Champloiseau, who had published a book arguing against the use of signs. Desloges explained, "like a Frenchman who sees his language belittled by a German who knows only a few French words, I thought I was obliged to defend my language against the false charges of this author." He describes a community of deaf people using a sign language (now referred to as Old French Sign Language).

The Abbe de l’Épée has often been credited with the invention of sign language, but this is incorrect. Desloges' book proves that French Sign Language predates the establishment of the famous school for the Deaf in Paris and is truly the invention of deaf people.

Desloges also wrote a number of well-received political books around the time of the French Revolution. The time and place of his death are unknown, but he published a book as late as 1792. Some suggest that he died in 1799.

Further reading
 Desloges, P.  Observations d'un sourd et muèt, sur un cours elémentaire d'education des sourds et muèts, Published in 1779 by M. l'Abbé Deschamps (Chapelain de l'Église d'Orléans), Amsterdam and B. Morin, Paris.
 Fischer, Renate. The Study of Natural Sign Language in Eighteenth-Century France. Sign Language Studies - Volume 2, Number 4, Summer 2002, pp. 391–406
 Moody, William: Pierre Desloges (1747-?). In: Cleve, John V. van (ed): Gallaudet encyclopedia of deaf people and deafness. Vol. 1. A-G. New York, NY [u.a.] : McGraw-Hill Book Company, Inc. (1987) - pp. 301–302

References

External links
 
 
 Observations d'un sourd et muèt sur un cours élémentaire d'éducation des sourds et muèts publié en 1779 par M. l'Abbé Deshamps, Chapelain de l'Église d'Orléans at Project Gutenberg

1747 births
1790s deaths
Year of death missing
Deaf writers
Bookbinders
French furniture makers
French deaf people